VV Eemdijk is a football club from Bunschoten-Spakenburg, Netherlands. They play in the Saturday Hoofdklasse.

History
VV Eemdijk played from 2015 through 2018 in the Saturday Hoofdklasse. In 2018, Eemdijk were promoted to the Derde Klasse. Eemdijk held only one season after in the Derde which it relegated back to the Hoofdklasse through the playoffs.

In the 2021–22 season, Eemdijk qualified for the promotion playoffs, where they played VVOG in the first round. After a 2–2 draw in the first leg, Eemdijk led 2–0 (4–2 on aggregate) with less than 20 minutes left, but conceded 3 goals in the span of 18 minutes, including an 89th-minute equalizer and a 92nd-minute winner. They ended up losing 5–4 on aggregate.

References

External links
 Official site

Football clubs in the Netherlands
Football clubs in Bunschoten
Association football clubs established in 1979
1979 establishments in the Netherlands